A vignette, in graphic design, is a French loanword meaning a unique form for a frame to an image, either illustration or photograph. Rather than the image's edges being rectilinear, it is overlaid with decorative artwork featuring a unique outline. This is similar to the use of the word in photography, where the edges of an image that has been vignetted are non-linear or sometimes softened with a mask – often a darkroom process of introducing a screen. An oval vignette is probably the most common example.

Originally a vignette was a design of vine-leaves and tendrils (vignette = small vine in French). The term was also used for a small embellishment without border, in what otherwise would have been a blank space, such as that found on a title-page, a headpiece or tailpiece.

The use in modern graphic design is derived from book publishing techniques dating back to the Middle Ages Analytical Bibliography (ca. 1450 to 1800) when a vignette referred to an engraved design printed using a copper-plate press, on a page that has already been printed on using a letter press (Printing press). 

Vignettes are sometimes distinguished from other in-text illustrations printed on a copper-plate press by the fact that they do not have a border; such designs usually appear on title-pages only. Woodcuts, which are printed on a letterpress and are also used to separate sections or chapters are identified as a headpiece, tailpiece or printer's ornament, depending on shape and position.

See also
Calligraphy, another conjunction of text and decoration
Curlicues, flourishes in the arts usually composed of concentric circles, often used in calligraphy
Scrollwork, general name for scrolling abstract decoration used in many areas of the visual arts

External links

Nat Vignette, a commercial font composed of vignettes
Graphic Design Tips & Guideline
Graphic Design Agency
Industri Designs NYC
Logo Forge

Graphic design
Illustration
Visual motifs